Linno Cave is a natural limestone cave and home to more than 500,000 of bats from over 10 species, including wrinkle-lipped free-tailed bats, lesser horseshoe bats and cave nectar bats. It is located in Hpa-an, Kayin State, Myanmar. The Linno Cave is a tourist destination and a famous place to see the sunset with thousands of bats flying out of the cave.

References 

Caves of Myanmar
Geography of Kayin State
Tourist attractions in Myanmar